Virgil Eugen Ghiță (born 4 June 1998) is a Romanian professional footballer who plays as a central defender for Ekstraklasa club MKS Cracovia.

International career
He made his debut for the Romania national football team on 5 September 2021 in a World Cup qualifier against Liechtenstein, a 2–0 home victory. He substituted Ionuț Nedelcearu in the 79th minute.

Career statistics

Club

International

Honours

Club
Viitorul Constanța
Cupa României: 2018–19
Supercupa României: 2019

References

External links
 

1998 births
Living people
Sportspeople from Pitești
Romanian footballers
Romania youth international footballers
Romania under-21 international footballers
Romania international footballers
Association football defenders
Liga I players
Ekstraklasa players
FC Viitorul Constanța players
FCV Farul Constanța players
MKS Cracovia (football) players
Romanian expatriate footballers
Expatriate footballers in Poland
Romanian expatriate sportspeople in Poland
Olympic footballers of Romania
Footballers at the 2020 Summer Olympics